Moaner may refer to:

Moaner van Heerden (born 1951), a South African rugby player
"Moaner" (song), by Underworld, 1997
"Moaner", a song by Hagfish
The Moaners, an American rock band

See also

Moan (disambiguation)
Moina (disambiguation)